The following list of Carnegie libraries in Wisconsin provides detailed information on United States Carnegie libraries in Wisconsin, where 63 public libraries were built from 60 grants (totaling $1,047,762) awarded by the Carnegie Corporation of New York from 1901 to 1915. In addition, academic libraries were built for 2 institutions (totaling $104,000).

Key

Public libraries

The Kaukauna library has been replaced and is being converted into an apartment building

Academic libraries

Notes

References

Note: The above references, while all authoritative, are not entirely mutually consistent. Some details of this list may have been drawn from one of the references without support from the others.  Reader discretion is advised.

Libraries
Wisconsin
Libraries